Carl Durheim, also known as Karl Durheim and Charles Durheim, (born 23 November 1810 in Bern, Switzerland; died 30 January 1890 in Bern, Switzerland) was a Swiss lithographer and an early photographer. He began working with daguerreotype in 1845 and changed to a paper printing process in 1849. Durheim produced many portraits of seated individuals.

References

External links

1810 births
1890 deaths
Swiss lithographers